Fubon Financial Holding Co., Ltd. is a financial investment holding company consists of the following key subsidiaries: Fubon Asset Management, Fubon Insurance Co. Ltd., Fubon Securities, Fubon Bank (present Taipei Fubon Bank), Fubon Life, Fubon Bank (China) and Fubon Bank (Hong Kong) Limited. The holding company was setup on 19 December 2001.

Fubon FHC has its headquarters in Taipei. Fubon Group's logo compresses "Fubon" to "FB" and uses two thick lines to spell "FB."

History
In September 2003, Fubon bought roughly 55% of International Bank of Asia from Arab Banking at a price of NT$19 billion, or 1.16 times of the net asset value of the bank. The acquisition of Jih Sun Financial Holding by Fubon was approved by shareholders of both companies in November 2021.

See also

List of banks in Taiwan
List of companies of Taiwan

References

External links

Fubon Group
Fubon Group 

Banks of Taiwan
Financial services companies of Taiwan
Holding companies of Taiwan
Companies based in Taipei
Banks established in 2008
Holding companies established in 2008
2008 establishments in Taiwan
Companies listed on the London Stock Exchange
Taiwanese brands